Solve et Coagula is a best-of compilation by American post-punk band Tuxedomoon, released in 1991 by Cramboy. A critic at Last Sigh Magazine gave the album a mixed review, calling it "a good introduction to Tuxedomoon's rich output, but it is far from exhaustive."

Track listing

Release history

References

External links 
 

1991 compilation albums
Tuxedomoon albums
Crammed Discs compilation albums